The 2011–12 season of the Frauen-Bundesliga is the 22nd season of Germany's premier women's football league. The season commenced on 21 August 2011 and will conclude on 28 May 2012. Turbine Potsdam were the defending champions and successfully defended their title on the last matchday. Potsdam became the first team to win Bundesliga title a fourth year in a row.

The start of the season saw Germany's record capped player Birgit Prinz ending her career and all-time Bundesliga topscorer Inka Grings leaving Duisburg after 16 years for Swiss side Zürich. A new all-time Bundesliga record was set on 20 May 2012 when 8,689 spectators saw the match Wolfsburg versus Frankfurt.

Teams
The teams promoted from the previous season's 2nd Bundesliga were Freiburg as winners of the Southern division and Lokomotive Leipzig as runners-up of the Northern division; Northern division champions Hamburger SV II as a reserve side were ineligible for promotion.

Managerial changes

League table

Results

Top scorers
Genoveva Añonma won the topscorer award with 22 goals and became the first non-German player to win the award in Bundesliga history.

References 

2011–12
GerWomen
women1
1